Gilmore Guys is an audio podcast that follows comedian Kevin T. Porter and writer/performer Demi Adejuyigbe as they watched every episode of the television series Gilmore Girls. The show represented two points of view, as Porter was a longtime Gilmore Girls fan and Adejuyigbe was watching it for the first time. They started the podcast on October 1st 2014, the same day that Gilmore Girls became available on Netflix, and released their final regular episode in June 2017.

The podcast episodes usually featured a weekly guest, including notable figures from the comedy and media world such as Jason Mantzoukas, Paul F. Tompkins, Ben Schwartz, and Michael Ausiello. The Gilmore Guys also performed live shows, taking the podcast on several tours around the United States. Upon completion of their Gilmore Girls coverage, they continued discussing other series created by Amy Sherman-Palladino: Bunheads starting in January 2017 with the name "Bunhead Bros", and then The Marvelous Mrs. Maisel, under the moniker "Maisel Goys", for which Adejuyigbe stepped down and was replaced with Alice Wetterlund.

Although it began as a small show, the podcast gained a strong following. Many members of the Gilmore Girls cast and crew joined the Guys for an interview (dubbed 'Gilmore Gabs'), including Lauren Graham, Milo Ventimiglia, Scott Patterson, Kelly Bishop, Sean Gunn, Liza Weil, Keiko Agena, David Sutcliffe, Vanessa Marano, and more. In 2017, Time magazine included Gilmore Guys in their list of "The 50 Best Podcasts Right Now".

History

On September 17, 2014—shortly before Gilmore Girls was made available on Netflix—Kevin T. Porter tweeted the below, to which Demi Adejuyigbe replied, expressing interest.

Wanna start a podcast where we go through every episode of Gilmore Girls called Gilmore Guys. Who wants to co-host / be a guest?

— Kevin T. Porter (@KevinTPorter)

Porter and Adejuyigbe both grew up in Texas and moved to Los Angeles. Though they had previously met and corresponded (primarily through mutual friends, attendance at live screenings, and UCB shows), they were not close friends and episode 1 of their podcast was the first time they had recorded content together. Porter worked as a freelance editor, and had gained some attention online for his "Sorkinisms" YouTube video, while Adejuyigbe worked as a digital producer and had established a strong following on Vine.

Gilmore Guys began as an independent venture, relying on self-production, self-promotion, and word of mouth, but soon gained a following. In June 2015, the two were invited to take part in the ATX Television Festival in Austin, Texas. They performed two live shows and worked the red carpet for the Gilmore Girls panel, interviewing cast members as they arrived. The hosts continued performing live shows. The live shows contained humorous musical numbers and audience Q&A.

In August 2015, Gilmore Guys was picked up by the HeadGum podcast network and gained corporate sponsorship. On October 19, 2015, they released an "Emergency Podcast" after news broke on TVLine that Netflix planned to revive the series for four 90-minute episodes. Porter and Adejuyigbe appeared in several different media to discuss the ramifications of the announcement, including an article written for The Guardian by Adejuyigbe, and an interview segment on NPR. Commenting on how this changed the dynamic of the podcast, Porter joked, "We've transitioned to the living". Porter and Adejuyigbe finished their coverage of the original seven seasons just before the revival was released, allowing then to comment on Gilmore Girls: A Year in the Life when it was brand new and without any gaps in their weekly installments.

Bunhead Bros
Early on in the podcast, Porter and Adejuyigbe announced their intention to cover the Amy Sherman-Palladino TV show Bunheads upon completing all of the Gilmore Girls episodes. This new series began in January 2017, under the moniker Bunhead Bros, but still released through the Gilmore Guys podcast feed. During this time the pilot of Sherman-Palladino's new TV show The Marvelous Mrs. Maisel was released, for which they held a special episode. They completed their commentary of Bunheads in May 2017.

The final episode of Gilmore Guys with its traditional hosts was an interview with actress Lauren Graham, who portrayed Lorelai Gilmore, released on June 3, 2017.

Maisel Goys
In January 2018, the podcast returned to cover episodes of Sherman-Palladino's new show The Marvelous Mrs. Maisel. Adejuyigbe declined to continue as a host, so Porter teamed up with comedian Alice Wetterlund, who had been a guest for five previous episodes. The pair call themselves the "Maisel Goys" but the series is still released through the Gilmore Guys podcast feed.

Format

Review episodes
The typical Gilmore Guys podcast episode involved Porter, Adejuyigbe, and usually a guest discussing a previously-viewed episode of Gilmore Girls (and later Bunheads). They cover the episodes chronologically and without spoilers for subsequent episodes.

Porter and Adejuyigbe approached the podcast in a relaxed, humorous, and improvisational manner. Their discussions of Gilmore Girls place "equal emphasis on sincere analysis and lighthearted mockery". They also enjoyed discussing the cultural significance of Gilmore Girls, such as how it explores feminism, and placing it in a present-day context. The two are known for going on tangents, and often end up discussing a range of other subjects besides Gilmore Girls.  The episodes started off averaging an hour in duration, but grew longer until they were typically 2–3 hours long.

Most of the episodes were recorded in a studio, but around 30 are from live show recordings. Starting with 5.07 these live shows were made available as video episodes on the Gilmore Guys YouTube channel, alongside the traditional audio format.

Gilmore Gabs
Starting in March 2015, Gilmore Guys started recording interviews with people involved in making Gilmore Girls. These differ from the typical episodes, in that they do not discuss a particular Gilmore Girls episode. The "Gabs" involved talking to cast or crew members about their upbringing, careers, how they ended up working on Gilmore Girls, and their personal experiences making the show. The Scott Patterson episode garnered considerable attention, not only because it featured a main actor of the show for the first time, but because Patterson mentioned "talks" of a Gilmore Girls revival. There are 24 total Gilmore Gab episodes.

Gilmail Guys
Although regular episodes included a Twitter Q&A segment with questions relating to that particular episode of Gilmore Girls, Adejuyigbe and Porter dedicated entire episodes to answering questions from their listeners. These questions came in the form of emails, voicemails, and occasionally live calls. There are a total of 25 Gilmail episodes and several "Call My Name" episodes.

Special episodes
Special episodes came in a variety of forms. Following Edward Herrmann's death on December 31, 2014, Gilmore Guys released a tribute episode which highlighted his contributions to the show. They also did several episodes discussing their expectations for the revival series. As a one-off, they recorded a parody episode called "The Entourage Entourage". They also did a special episode discussing the pilot of Amy Sherman-Palladino's new series The Marvelous Mrs. Maisel.

The guys did a live show called "Live in NYC – The Lost Scripts" in which they performed scripts they had written based on Gilmore Girls characters. The scripts featured many inside jokes from the TV show and the podcast.

Recurring segments

Pop Goes the Culture
This segment contains a supercut of all of the pop-culture references (which Gilmore Girls was famous for) from the episode being discussed, after which the hosts discuss the varied, and sometimes far-out references. The supercut is regularly over a minute long.

Netflix Synopsis
Adejuyigbe and Porter read the Netflix synopsis of the episode and discussed how well they summarised the episode and whether or not they included spoilers for new viewers.

Fashion Report
The Guys begin and end their fashion report with a unified "Fa-Fa-Fa-Fa-Fa-Fa-Fa-Fa-Fa-Fa-Fa-Fa-Fashion!". Each episode, this segment involves the Guys breaking down the good, the bad, and the ugly of what the characters wore.

Original WB Promos
The Guys occasionally played Gilmore Girls promos, which ran on The WB and CW when the show was on the air (most of them done by the WB's voice announcer, Hal Douglas), creating comedic commentary on the tonal shift between the promos which spoiled episodes and had a tone which did not match that of the show itself. They also play radio promos when available.

Twitter Q&A
Porter and Adejuyigbe take select questions from Twitter and Facebook (and from the audience at live shows) and answer and discuss them. Before recording each episode of the podcast, they "open the floor" to questions across social media for this segment. Adejuyigbe sings a "Twitter Q&A" jingle to open the segment. In later episodes, the two started running polls on Twitter to gauge their audience's opinion on certain matters, which they would then discuss on the podcast.

Television Without Pity
Beginning in their coverage of season 5, the hosts read and discuss comments from the now-defunct Television Without Pity, also referred to as TWoP, which continues to maintain their forums, including one for Gilmore Girls, in archived form. These comments were all posted at the time that episodes originally aired. Occasionally, Porter will come across comments that he posted, and either he or Adejuyigbe will read them on air. To open the segment, they play clips from popular songs or films and replace words from the songs with "TWoP".

Rating the Episode
At the end of each podcast episode, Kevin, Demi, and their guest assign the Gilmore Girls episode a rating (typically on a scale of 1 to 10). The rating standard is usually a humorous object or idea from the episode, such as "Wal-Mart Employee of the Month Plaques".

*Overall Ratings factor in Kevin, Demi, and their guests' ratings for each episode.

Where You Tweet, I Will Follow
Kevin and Demi give guests the opportunity to plug their upcoming projects, performances, and social media accounts. The guys will also plug their own social media accounts. Starting in their coverage of the fifth season of Gilmore Girls, in keeping with the pop culture theme of the show, the Guys and their guest each also give a "pop culture plug" where they plug a TV show, movie, album or book they are enjoying. Where You Tweet, I Will Follow is the only recurring segment to be included in the Gilmore Gabs episodes as well as the standard review episodes.

Each episode concludes with the guys and their guest singing along to Where You Lead, the theme from Gilmore Girls.

Recognition and ratings
Gilmore Guys first gained recognition when they were featured in an article for The Atlantic in December 2014, after which it ranked number one on iTunes comedy podcasts. By December 2015, the episodes had been downloaded five million times, for an average of 40,000 listeners per episode. The same month, The Hundreds included Gilmore Guys on their list of the ten "Best Podcasts of 2015". In January 2016, the podcast was nominated for a Shorty Award in the category of Best Podcast. By November 2016, they were getting between 150,000 and 200,000 downloads per episode.

An article in Time magazine described how "The podcast has created a community, its own language and a galley of recurring jokes and references, such as affectionately referring to fans as 'Gillies,' or teasing Porter for easily crying at the show's more emotional moments." Sadaf Ahsan of the National Post commented that the podcast "helped reignite – and, for some, initiate – fan fervour" towards Gilmore Girls, thus helping lead to its revival. In 2017, Time named Gilmore Guys one of the "Top 50 Podcasts Right Now".

Porter and Adejuyigbe were given a cameo appearance on the Gilmore Girls revival miniseries A Year in the Life. The duo also appeared for short segments of commentary about Gilmore Girls on the Up television network.

They were interviewed in the Stuff Mom Never Told You episode "Gilmore Girls and Guys".

References

External links
 

Audio podcasts
Film and television podcasts
Comedy and humor podcasts
Gilmore Girls
2014 podcast debuts
Headgum
2017 podcast endings